Marcia Anne Pankratz (born October 1, 1964) is an American former field hockey forward and current head coach for the Michigan Wolverines. Pankratz participated in two Summer Olympics. In 1988 she finished in eighth position with Team USA, in 1996 she claimed the fifth spot. Pankratz had 110 international appearances over the course of her career.

Career

Playing career
Pankratz attended Wakefield High School and the University of Iowa, where she played for the Hawkeyes. She finished her career with 76 goals to rank third among all-time Iowa goal scorers. She was chosen for the NCAA All-Tournament team in 1984 and was part of the first team of the Big Ten All-Decade Team (1981–91). She was named University of Iowa Female Athlete of the Year and was twice (1984 and 1985) selected All-American. She won the Big Ten Medal of Honor for 1985–86.

Pankratz was vice-captain of Team USA from 1985–1996. She played with the team that won a bronze medal at the Hockey World Cup in 1986 and 1994, a bronze medal at the 1991 Pan American Games, a silver at the Pan Am Games in 1995, and a bronze at the 1995 Hockey Champions Trophy tournament. She scored three goals at the 1996 Olympic Games.

Coaching career
She was assistant coach at the University of North Carolina at Chapel Hill, and was head coach at the University of Michigan when the Wolverines won the 2001 NCAA Championship, the first NCAA championship  by a women's team in the history of Michigan athletics. Pankratz has guided Michigan to seven Big Ten Tournament Championships and ten Big Ten regular-season titles during her tenure. 

In 2017, Michigan swept the Big Ten regular-season and tournament championships and recorded a program-record 21 wins, including 18 in a row, en route to the NCAA Final Four. In 2020, Michigan swept the Big Ten regular-season and tournament championships, and advanced to the 2020 NCAA Championship where they lost in the championship game to North Carolina in overtime. She is the winningest coach in Michigan field hockey history, with a record of 333–142.

References

External links
 
4 Goals - Pankratz Consulting Group
US Field Hockey

1964 births
Living people
American female field hockey players
Field hockey players at the 1988 Summer Olympics
Field hockey players at the 1996 Summer Olympics
Michigan Wolverines field hockey coaches
North Carolina Tar Heels field hockey coaches
Olympic field hockey players of the United States
Iowa Hawkeyes field hockey players
Pan American Games silver medalists for the United States
Pan American Games bronze medalists for the United States
Pan American Games medalists in field hockey
Field hockey players at the 1991 Pan American Games
Field hockey players at the 1995 Pan American Games
Medalists at the 1991 Pan American Games
Medalists at the 1995 Pan American Games